The Jharkhand football team (Hindi:झारखंड फुटबॉल टीम) is an Indian football team representing Jharkhand in Indian state football competitions including the Santosh Trophy. They failed to qualify for the most of Santosh Trophy final rounds.

Honours 
 B.C. Roy Trophy
 Winners (4): 2004–05, 2005–06, 2006–07, 2008–09
 Mir Iqbal Hussain Trophy
 Winners (2): 2009–10, 2010–11

References

Santosh Trophy teams
Football in Jharkhand